This is a list of exhibitions held by the Australian Performing Arts Collection at the Arts Centre Melbourne, Melbourne, Victoria, organised chronologically and grouped by decade until 2017. Since 2017, the Australian Music Vault has housed a permanent exhibition utilising the APAC collection. The collections on display are rotated regularly. Previous exhibitions have toured nationally and internationally, while other collections are occasionally loaned.

1980s

1990s

2000s

2010s

References 

Art exhibitions in Australia